Portocannone (Arbërisht: Portkanuni) (gate of the law) is an Arbëreshë comune in the Province of Campobasso, in the Italian region Molise, located about  northeast of Campobasso.

Transportation 
Portocannone was served by a railway station, the Guglionesi-Portocannone railway station.on the Termoli-Campobasso and Termoli–Venafro line, but the station has been closed for a few years and does not have passenger service.

People
The grand-father of Mateo Musacchio was born in this City.

References

Arbëresh settlements
Cities and towns in Molise